Finney is a surname. Notable people with the surname include:

Albert Finney (1936–2019), English actor
Alex Finney (1902–1982), English association footballer
Ben Finney (1933–2017), American anthropologist, co-founder of the Polynesian Voyaging Society
Charles Grandison Finney (1792–1875), American revivalist
Charles G. Finney (1905–1984), American newspaperman and writer
Christopher Finney (born 1984), British soldier
Dave Finney (1933–2022), American lawyer and politician
D. J. Finney (1917–2018), British statistician
Ernest A. Finney Jr. (1931–2017), American judge
Florence Finney (1903–1994), American politician
Gail Finney (1959–2022), American businesswoman and politician
Hal Finney (baseball) (1905–1991), Major League Baseball catcher
Hal Finney (computer scientist) (1956–2014), developer for PGP Corporation, the second developer hired after Phil Zimmermann
Harry Anson Finney (1886–1966), American accountancy author
Jack Finney (1911–1995), American author
Karen Finney, American political consultant and commentator
Tom Finney (1922–2014), English association footballer
Yasmin Finney (born 2003), English actress
Ida Finney Mackrille (1867–1960), American suffragist and a women's political leader in the State of California.
John Morton-Finney (1889–1998), civil rights activist, lawyer and educator

Other uses
Finney (TV series), a British television Crime drama series from 1994 on ITV
Finney, Kentucky
Finney County, Kansas

See also
Dorian Finney-Smith (born 1993), American basketball player
Feeney, a surname
Finneytown, Ohio
Finnie, a surname
Finny (disambiguation)
Phinney, a surname